Thomas Chen Tianhao is the current serving bishop of the Roman Catholic Diocese of Qingdao, China.

Early life 
Chen was born in Pingdu, Shandong, China in 1962.

Priesthood 
On 17 December 1989, Chen, was ordained as a priest. He completed his studies from the Holy Spirit seminary in Shandong.

Episcopate 
Chen was selected to be the bishop of the Roman Catholic Diocese of Qingdao on 19 November 2019 and ordained a bishop on 23 November 2020 at St. Michael's Cathedral in Qingdao by John Fang Xingyao.

References 

Chinese bishops
Chinese Roman Catholic bishops
1962 births
Living people